The Pennzoil 400 presented by Jiffy Lube is a NASCAR Cup Series stock car race held annually at Las Vegas Motor Speedway in Las Vegas, Nevada. It is the first of two races at Las Vegas with the other one being the South Point 400 in the playoffs. The inaugural race was held in 1998. For several years, the race was sponsored by United Auto Workers and DaimlerChrysler. From its inception, the race was run at a distance of  except 2009, which was 427 miles. The extra 27 miles in the 2009 race were added by the sponsors Carroll Shelby International.

The race is unique in that its winner receives a championship belt rather than a trophy. The race was also part of the No Bull 5 challenge from 1999 to 2002.

From 2001 until 2008, this race carried sponsorship from Chrysler. For the first six of those years, the race was known as the UAW-DaimlerChrysler 400 to reflect Chrysler's partnership with then-Daimler Benz. After Daimler sold Chrysler to Cerberus Capital Management, the race became known as the UAW-Dodge 400 for the 2008 race. Carroll Shelby International took over as a sponsor for 2009 and 2010, with the 2009 race adding  as part of the sponsorship in honor of the Shelby 427 Cobra; the 2010 race was known as the Shelby American. Lowe's, through its Kobalt Tools subsidiary, became the race's title sponsor for 2011; Kobalt was the title sponsor for the spring race at Atlanta until the track gave up its early-season date after 2010. The race was called the Kobalt Tools 400 from 2011 to 2013 before becoming the Kobalt 400 for 2014 to 2017.  For the 2018 season, the race became the Pennzoil 400. William Byron is the defending race winner.

Past winners

Notes
 2000: Race shortened due to rain.
 2006, 2022, & 2023: Race extended due to NASCAR overtime.

Multiple winners (drivers)

Multiple winners (teams)

Manufacturer wins

References

External links
 

1998 establishments in Nevada
 
NASCAR Cup Series races
Recurring sporting events established in 1998
Annual sporting events in the United States